The 2011 Big West Conference men's basketball tournament took place from March 10–12, 2011 at the Honda Center in Anaheim, California. The Tournament was previously held at the Anaheim Convention Center. The winner of the tournament, UC Santa Barbara, received the conference's automatic bid to the 2011 NCAA Men's Division I Basketball Tournament, where they lost in the first round to Florida.

Format
The top eight teams in the conference qualified for the 2011 Big West tournament.

Bracket

 Asterisk (*) indicates overtime game

References

Tournament
Big West Conference men's basketball tournament
Big West Conference men's basketball tournament
Big West Conference men's basketball tournament